Kyle J. White (born 1987), American financial analyst and former United States Army soldier

Kyle White may also refer to:

Kyle White (rugby league) (born 1970), Australian rugby league player
Kyle White (footballer) (born 2004), English footballer

See also
Kyle Powys Whyte, American indigenous philosopher and scholar